Meri Nimmo is a 2018 Indian drama film directed by Rahul Ganore Shanklya and produced by Aanand L. Rai. The film stars Anjali Patil as Nimmo, and Karan Dave as Hemu, an eight-year-old boy who falls in love with a 24-year-old woman.It premiered at the 47th International Film Festival of India and the Mumbai Film Festival in 2017 where it earned critical praise. Meri Nimmo was released online digitally through Eros Now on 27 April 2018.

Cast
 Anjali Patil as Nimmo
 Karan Dave as Hemu
 Shalini Pandey as Nimmo's friend
 Aryan Mishra as Matru
 Sunayana Agarwal as Hemu's Mother
 Amar Singh Parihar as Dulha (Bridegroom)
 Sarika Nayak as Nimmo's Bua
 Vivek Pandey as Nimmo's Father
 Rana Pratap Sengar as Shailu
 Anshul Thakur as Mahendra

Soundtrack

The soundtrack of Meri Nimmo consists of 3 songs composed by Krsna Solo and Mangesh Dhakde the lyrics of which have been written by Raj Shekhar.

Reception
Udita Jhunjhunwala of Firstpost called the film a "uncomplicated and sweet story" but felt the runtime was stretched. R. J. Alok gave a positive review and called the film "relatable". Nandini Ramnath of Scroll praised the performances of Anjali Patil and Karan Dave and said that, "Despite its narrative holes, the 90-minute film has been directed with confidence and has identifiable characters." Rahul Shanklya of Film Companion gave the film a rating of 3 out of 5 and said that, "It’s sweet, even when it gets repetitive (90 minutes does seem long here), because the makers don’t employ the usual crutches accompanying such themes". Mayank Shekhar of Mid-Day was impressed with the film and said that, "Meri Nimmo, produced by Aanand L Rai, is a rare Hindi film that tells you as much about childhood as life in a village."

References

External links
 

Hindi-language drama films
Eros Now original films
2010s Hindi-language films
Indian drama films
2018 direct-to-video films
Films scored by Krsna Solo
Films scored by Mangesh Dhakde
2018 drama films